Inzari is a village in Nizampur, Pakistan.

The word Inzari is derived from the word "inzar" (Pushto — a type of fruit, Latin Ficus carica).  Inzari is a mountainous area in the district of Nowshera, Nizampur.  Sited on rocky soil, Inzari is situated at the foot of the Khattak Mountain Range, adjacent to Cherat and Nowshera.  Its neighboring villages are Hisartang to the east, Siavi and Handsar (Shaheen Abad) to the south and Taar Khail, which lies west of Inzari's mountain range.

History 

The oldest graveyard in the village is situated near the Hospital (BHU). The village has the Qibla Mosque, the Loharan Mosque and the Usmankhel Mosque. The Qibla mosque (since 1904) contains the grave of one of Inzari's most famous religious leaders, Maulana Muhammad Ghulam Noor who was the father of Maulana Salamat Ullah (ex-provincial naib Ameer Jamat Islami KPK).

Population 

Inzari is the biggest village of the Nizampur area, also known as Khuwara (from pashto word Khwar= Rainy Creek).  Its population is nearly 10,000 (in 2011), all Pashtun.  99% are of the Khattak tribe which is further divided into sub-castes ("Khail" in Pushto).  The main Khails are Nasokhail (55%), Usmankhel (30%), Chawarkhail (10%) and others (5%) such as Luharan, Nayaan, Nandapan and Mulayan.  Settlements include Gandhab, Khankoi (Siavi) and Handsar (Shaheen Abad).inzari is a good place for tourism.

Economy
The village primarily houses workers and farmers, along with low-to-middle standard traders. Many people are drafted in the Pakistan Army.  Inzari mustered 4000 votes in the 2008 election.

Infrastructure 

The village has two approximately 30-foot wide approach roads which link to the main Nizampur-Khairabad road. It has electricity, a water tube well and four natural springs, situated in Kwatkay, Dalukay, Kamtra Chana, and Lako Taro Chana (chana Pashto word means natural springs in Urdu called chashma).  Telephone services are available. Cooking and heating use wood that residents fetch from the mountains. Streets are generally wide enough that at most houses are accessible by car.  A "natural" sewerage system utilises the village's relatively high altitude. The most serious infrastructure problems of the village are the unavailability of natural gas and lack of higher education.

Environment 

Although Inzari has a very hot climate, the winters are cold. High winds are the most important weather element.

Education 

Residents have lower than average literacy. The village has one high school for girls and one for boys.  Primary schools include two for boys and two for girls.  Two public English Medium schools are there. Mujahid Children's Academy, was the first public school to be known as an Ali Public School.

Health

One Basic Health Unit(BHU) Hospital is in the village. Thanks to People's Primary Healthcare Initiative (PPHI), NGOs such as UNICEF, WHO, BDN and other foreign aid supply the hospital with medicine and equipment.

References 

Populated places in Nowshera District